Alvin L. Gittins (17 January 1922 – 7 March 1981) was an English-born artist who was a professor at the University of Utah.  He has been described as "one of [the United States] greatest portrait artists ever".

Life and career
Gittins was born in Kidderminster, Worcestershire, England.  He attended art school in London.  Gittins was raised in the Church of Jesus Christ of Latter-day Saints in England.  He first came to the United States in 1946 and graduated from Brigham Young University in 1947.  He was appointed a member of the University of Utah art faculty in 1947.  From 1956 to 1962 Gittins was head of the University of Utah art department.

Gittins painted 89 portraits of people connected with the University of Utah and at least one of his portraits hangs in almost every campus building.  He focused heavily on the detail of human figures and sought to bring out his subjects feelings in his paintings.  As a professor, Gittins was noted for insisting on intensive studies of anatomy and perspective at a time when most art programs focused on expressionist art.

Among the many people Gittins painted portraits of were David O. McKay, Henry Eyring, Maurice Abravanel and Haile Selassie I.  However, not all of Gittins' subjects were living.  He also painted a portrait of Joseph Smith. Gittins' work was exhibited at the Royal Society of Portrait Painters and the Royal Society of British Painters in London as well as at Portraits, Inc. in New York City.

Gittins married Gwendolen Ellis and they had four children.

Notes

References

.
Alvin Gittins, State of Utah Collections, Utah Division of Arts & Museums

External links
Alvin L. Gittins Photograph Collection at the University of Utah Marriott Library Special Collections.
The Alvin L. Gittins Papers at the University of Utah Marriott Library Special Collections.
Alvin L. Gittins, Utah Artists Project, University of Utah

1922 births
1981 deaths
Artists from Utah
Brigham Young University alumni
English emigrants to the United States
English Latter Day Saints
Latter Day Saint artists
English portrait painters
University of Utah faculty
People from Kidderminster
20th-century English painters
English male painters